Michael James Rowland (born 15 January 1964) is an Australian film director.

Early years 
Prior to his screen career, Rowland studied graphic design at the North Adelaide School of Art in South Australia and started his early working life as a designer and illustrator specialising in the arts. His list of freelance clients grew to include Sony (US), Womad (International) and Peter Gabriel (UK). He also held the position of Art Director with the Adelaide Festival of Arts (1987–93) a job which saw him work with some notable artists, including Peter Brook, 7th Earl of Harewood, Cheek by Jowl, Jan Fabre, Sankai Juku, Andy Goldsworthy, Winton Marsalis, the Kronos Quartet, Zubin Mehta and Pierre Boulez. He has won numerous awards for his design and illustration, including the 1992 AADC's Master's Chair.

Cowboy Books 
Michael established the graphic novella imprint Cowboy Books in 1990 with the publication of the awarding winning Ten Drawings of the Jungle. This first title was followed up two years later with The Existentialist Cowboys Last Stand (1992) and Life Advice for High-Plains Drifters (2000). Cowboy Books sell throughout Europe, North America and Australia.

Film school 
Michael 'retired' from graphic design in 1994, relocating to Sydney to study for a BA in Film at the Australian Film, Television and Radio School (AFTRS). In his first year as an undergraduate the screenrights to his novella The Existentialist Cowboy's Last Stand were bought and it was made into one of Australia's most successful short films of the 1990s, along the way earning Michael his first Australian Film Institute (AFI) nomination. The second came with the Russian language, space-race short, Flying Over Mother (1996), cementing his reputation as an original screenwriter/director with a global audience.

First feature film 
His first feature film, Lucky Miles (2007), is set in 1990 Western Australia. Unfolding as a traditional Australian tale of men lost in the desert, Lucky Miles packs a bold twist updating the genre with an ensemble cast including Kenneth Moraleda, Rodney Afif  and Srisacd Sacdapraseuth. Lucky Miles was chosen to be the highly successful opening night film of the 2007 Adelaide Film Festival and later that year beat out the cream of global cinema to win the audience award for Best Film at the 2007 Sydney Film Festival. Other awards include; the Special Jury Prize at the 2007 Karlovy Vary International Film Festival; Best Screenplay at the Vladivostok International Film Festival; the Black Pearl for Best New Director at the Middle East International Film Festival; the Grand Prix at the 9th Rencontres Internationales du Cinéma des Antipodes and Best Film at the Asian Festival of First Films.

In 2008, Australia's national broadcaster, ABC1, programmed Lucky Miles at 8:30 pm Sunday night on the Australia Day long-weekend holiday. Its contribution to the nation's celebration.

First television feature 
In 2008, Rowland co-wrote and directed the one-hour ABC, RTÉ, BBC drama The Last Confession of Alexander Pearce. Set in 1824 Van Diemen's Land, The Last Confession of Alexander Pearce tells the true story of an escape from the notorious British prison Sarah Island by eight convicts. Its Gothic narrative plots their privation and descent into cannibalism, through to the execution of the sole survivor, Alexander Pearce, for the murder of Thomas Cox. It was co-written and produced by Nial Fulton.

The Last Confession of Alexander Pearce drew TV industry nominations in both Europe and Australia. It was nominated for Best Telefeature at the 2009 Australian Film Institute (AFI) Awards, Best Drama at the 2009 Irish Film & Television Academy (IFTA) Awards and Best Drama in the 2010 Rose D'Or awards, Switzerland. Reflecting its 'factual' funding, in 2009 The Last Confession of Alexander Pearce won Best Documentary at the IF Awards.

For his work, Michael was nominated in the Best Telemovie Director category at the Australian Directors Guild Awards 2009, composer Roger Mason won Best Music for a Telemovie at the 2009 Australian Screen Music Award and Designer Felicity Abbott and props master Paul Stewart were both recognised for their work on the film at the 2009 Newport International Film Festival.

In 2009 Australia's national broadcaster, ABC1, programmed The Last Confession of Alexander Pearce in prime time on Sunday night over the Australia Day long weekend. The previous year Lucky Miles had been programmed in the same 8:30 pm slot, making it the second year in a row the ABC had screened a Rowland feature to mark the nation's celebration.

Series Television 
During 2010 and 2011 Michael directed 8 episodes of AFI and IF award winning series My Place, produced by Penny Chapman. He directed 3 episodes in the first series and was nominated for an Australian Directors Guild Award. He returned to the second series as set-up director and helmed a further 5 episodes.

Early in 2011 he directed two episodes of the genre breaking comedy/drama/romance Spirited, produced by Jacquelin Perske and Claudia Karvan. Mid year he directed three episodes of the ballet-teen-drama Dance Academy, produced by Werner Film Productions for ABC, and in the second half of the year directed three episodes of  the award winning Foxtel drama Tangle.

Notes

External links 
 Official website Australian Film Television and Radio School
  The Internet Movie Database
  Adelaide Film Festival
  Variety
  Cowboy Books

Australian film directors
People from Adelaide
1964 births
Living people
Australian Film Television and Radio School alumni